Sandro Kaiser is a German retired footballer.

References

External links
 

German footballers
Living people
TSV 1860 Munich players
TSV 1860 Munich II players
FSV Frankfurt players
SpVgg Unterhaching players
1989 births
2. Bundesliga players
Association football midfielders
SpVgg Unterhaching II players